Karolina Andreyevna Sevastyanova (born 25 April 1995) is a Russian group rhythmic gymnast. She is the 2012 Olympics Group All-around champion, 2012 European Group All-around champion and 2010 Youth Olympic Games Group All-around champion.

Career 

Sevastyanova competed as an individual gymnast on the junior level, appearing in international competitions. She competed in Miss Valentine 2005 in Estonia with Margarita Mamun. Later, she started competing with the Russian Group. 

Sevastyanova was a member of the Russian Junior Group that won the gold medal at the 2010 Youth Olympic Games. In 2012, she was selected to compete with the Russian Senior Group as a replacement for the injured Natalia Pichuzhkina. They won the gold medal at the 2012 European Championships and at the World Cup Final in Minsk.

With Uliana Donskova, Anastasia Bliznyuk, Alina Makarenko, Anastasia Nazarenko, and Ksenia Dudkina, Sevastyanova won a gold medal at the 2012 Summer Olympics in the group all-around event. They ate only buckwheat for six months leading up to the Olympic Games. Sevastyanova was voted the most beautiful female athlete from the CIS countries participating at the 2012 Olympics. 17,200 people from Russia, Ukraine, Belarus, Kazakhstan, Moldova, Armenia, Azerbaijan, Uzbekistan and Kyrgyzstan took part in the survey. Sevastyanova retired from competition at the age of 17 following the event. She planned to get her college degree at Moscow State University and explore working as a TV presenter or host.

Sevastyanova appeared in the cover of the Russian edition of Maxim magazine in February 2015.

Detailed Olympic results

See also
List of Youth Olympic Games gold medalists who won Olympic gold medals

References

External links

 
 
 
 
 

Living people
Russian rhythmic gymnasts
Olympic gymnasts of Russia
Olympic gold medalists for Russia
Olympic medalists in gymnastics
Gymnasts at the 2012 Summer Olympics
Gymnasts at the 2010 Summer Youth Olympics
1995 births
Medalists at the 2012 Summer Olympics
Gymnasts from Kyiv
Youth Olympic gold medalists for Russia
Medalists at the Rhythmic Gymnastics European Championships